Mohammad Fariduddin (born 7 May 1985 in Khulna), generally known just as Fariduddin, is a Bangladeshi first-class and List A cricketer who made his debut for Khulna Division in the  2006–07 season. He is a right-handed batsman and a right-arm off break bowler. He is sometimes being referred to by his nickname "Masud". Fariduddin last played at the highest level in the 2014–15 season when he was representing Barisal Division and Kala Bagan Krira Chakra.

References

Living people
Barisal Division cricketers
Sylhet Division cricketers
Prime Bank Cricket Club cricketers
1985 births
Bangladeshi cricketers
Khulna Division cricketers
Kala Bagan Krira Chakra cricketers